Dario Tomić (born 23 June 1987) is a Croatian footballer who plays for German amateur side FC Blaubeuren.

Club career 
Born in Tuzla, Tomić began his career by going through the ranks of his local side FK Sloboda Tuzla, debuting for the first team in 2005, aged 17. Sent on loan to the third-tier NK Bratstvo Gračanica, aged 19, he was a part of the team that won the 2006–07 season of the Second league of the FBH – North, and ascended to the Prva Liga FBiH.

After that season, however, he, along with his family, moved to Malinska on the island of Krk, signing for the lower-tier NK Krk.

He went on playing for several seasons in the lower tiers of Croatian football – two seasons for NK Novalja in the Treća HNL and three seasons in the Druga HNL, playing for NK Pomorac Kostrena, HNK Gorica, NK Međimurje and NK Hrvatski Dragovoljac until he achieved promotion with Dragovoljac to the Prva HNL. He made his Prva HNL debut in the first round of the 2012–13 season, playing the entire match against NK Lokomotiva in a 2–0 home loss.

Following his club's relegation in the summer of 2014, he moved to NK Istra 1961. He spent his latter years in the German lower leagues.

References

External links
 

1987 births
Living people
Sportspeople from Tuzla
Croats of Bosnia and Herzegovina
Association football fullbacks
Bosnia and Herzegovina footballers
Croatian footballers
FK Sloboda Tuzla players
NK Bratstvo Gračanica players
NK Krk players
NK Novalja players
NK Pomorac 1921 players
HNK Gorica players
NK Međimurje players
NK Hrvatski Dragovoljac players
NK Istra 1961 players
FK Liepāja players
OFK Titograd players
NK Krško players
Premier League of Bosnia and Herzegovina players
First Football League (Croatia) players
Croatian Football League players
Latvian Higher League players
Slovenian PrvaLiga players
Landesliga players
Croatian expatriate footballers
Expatriate footballers in Latvia
Croatian expatriate sportspeople in Latvia
Expatriate footballers in Montenegro
Croatian expatriate sportspeople in Montenegro
Expatriate footballers in Slovenia
Croatian expatriate sportspeople in Slovenia
Expatriate footballers in Germany
Croatian expatriate sportspeople in Germany